Michael John Belfiore (born October 3, 1988) is an American former Major League Baseball pitcher who played for the Baltimore Orioles in 2013.

Belfiore attended Boston College where he was a first baseman and a pitcher. After being drafted by the Arizona Diamondbacks in the 2009 Major League Baseball draft, Belfiore became a full-time pitcher. Belfiore has played professionally with the Missoula Osprey (2009), and the South Bend Silver Hawks (2010). He was a Pioneer League All-Star in 2009. Belfiore bats right-handed, while throwing left.

Amateur career
Belfiore attended Commack High School, where he played first base, outfield, and pitcher as a member of the school's baseball team. During his senior season in 2006, Belfiore won the Section XI League Most Valuable Player award; the Gibson Award, an award given to the best pitcher in Suffolk County; was named to All-Long Island team; was a first-team All-State All-League and All-County selection; and won the Commack High School Most Outstanding Athlete award. He was also a Suffolk County Hall of Fame inductee in 2006. He started all four of his years on the school's baseball team.

He was perhaps best known in high school for his epic showdown with pitcher Jesse Katz, of Northport High School.

After high school, Belfiore enrolled at Boston College. During his freshman year, as a member of the Boston College Eagles baseball team, Belfiore batted .297 with eight doubles, one triple, three home runs, and 22 runs batted in (RBIs) in 49 games played as a first baseman and designated hitter. As a pitcher, Belfiore compiled a 0–2 record with a 10.45 earned run average (ERA), one save, and five strikeouts in seven games, one start.

During his sophomore season at Boston College, Belfiore batted .274 with 10 doubles, two home runs, and 26 RBIs as a position player. As a pitcher, he went 2–0 with a 2.45 ERA, eight saves, and 19 strikeouts in 18 games. In 2008, he played collegiate summer baseball in the Cape Cod Baseball League for the Yarmouth-Dennis Red Sox.

In his junior year, Belfiore batted .273 with 17 doubles, one triple, 11 home runs, and 62 RBIs at the plate. He went 5–1 with a 2.05 ERA, nine saves, and 59 strikeouts on the mound. After the season, he was an American Baseball Coaches Association All-American Second-Team selection. He was also named the National Collegiate Baseball Writers Association District I Player of the Year. During the 2009 Major League Baseball draft, the Arizona Diamondbacks selected Belfiore with the 45th pick in the first round. He was one of five players selected by the Diamondbacks in the first-round during the 2009 draft. At the time, it was commented that Belfiore would be used as a pitcher in professional baseball.

Professional career

Arizona Diamondbacks
Belfiore made his professional baseball debut in 2009 with the rookie-level Missoula Osprey of the Pioneer League. On the subject of pitching in professional baseball, Belfiore said, "In college I just threw fastballs and a slider and blew guys away...You have to use your changeup and understand hitters counts [at this level]". He was a league all-star that season. With Missoula, he went 2–2 with a 2.17 ERA, and 55 strikeouts in 14 games, 11 starts. At the start of the 2010 season, Belfiore was assigned to play with the South Bend Silver Hawks of the Class-A Midwest League. On the season, he compiled a 3–10 record with a 3.99 ERA, and 105 strikeouts in 25 games, all starts.

Baltimore Orioles
Belfiore was traded to the Baltimore Orioles as the player to be named later in the April trade that sent Josh Bell to Arizona on May 12, 2012.

Belfiore was recalled by the Orioles from the Triple-A Norfolk Tides on May 12, 2013, and returned to Norfolk the next day. Belfiore was recalled again on September 21, and made his major league debut on September 27. Pitching to his first batter, he allowed a home run to David Ortiz.

Detroit Tigers
On April 3, 2014, the Detroit Tigers claimed Belfiore off waivers and sent him to the Triple-A Toledo Mud Hens. He was released on August 15, 2015, to make room for Kyle Lobstein, who was sent to the Mud Hens on a rehab assignment. He elected free agency on November 6.

Personal
Belfiore was born in Commack, New York. He is the middle child of Michael and Patricia Belfiore.

See also

References

External links

1988 births
Living people
People from Commack, New York
Baseball players from New York (state)
Major League Baseball pitchers
Baltimore Orioles players
Boston College Eagles baseball players
Yarmouth–Dennis Red Sox players
Missoula Osprey players
South Bend Silver Hawks players
Visalia Rawhide players
Bowie Baysox players
Mesa Solar Sox players
Norfolk Tides players
Toledo Mud Hens players